The Raider Nation is the official name for the fans of the National Football League (NFL)'s Las Vegas Raiders (formerly the Oakland Raiders and the Los Angeles Raiders). Fan Jim Hudson coined the term in the 1990s when the Raiders returned to Oakland after a long hiatus in Los Angeles, thus becoming a team with a regional fanbase.

The team's fans devotion is chronicled in Better to Reign in Hell, a book written by San Diego English professor Jim Miller and Kelly Mayhew, who are Raiders fans.

Characteristics
The city of Oakland's working-class background and "underdog status" compared to its neighboring city of San Francisco is cited as the foundation of the Raider Nation and its image, as is the influence of "outlaws" such as owner Al Davis and players like Ted Hendricks, John Matuszak, Bob Brown, Ken Stabler, Jack Tatum, and Lyle Alzado in creating a bad boy image. The team's aggressive style of play during the 1970s and 1980s, when the Raiders won their three Super Bowls, is also mentioned. This perception did not change when the Raiders moved to Los Angeles, but the move did diversify their fan base to include more Latinos and African Americans, and the Raiders would become increasingly associated with West Coast gangsta rap groups like N.W.A during this period. Multiple heavy metal bands would also express their support for the team such as Metallica, Slayer, Machine Head, Megadeth, and more. This association would lead to the Raider Nation spreading throughout the country and turning the team into an internationally transcendent brand; the fans would also gain a reputation for their unrelenting devotion.

Members of the Raider Nation take pride in their image, and many of the most devoted Raiders fans dress up in elaborate costumes on game day. Many of these costumes are intended to be intimidating and eccentric while also adhering to the Raiders' silver and black color scheme, and many fans also create alter egos for these characters as well. These fans are typically the ones that are most associated with the Raider Nation and The Black Hole. Late actress and singer Naya Rivera was a notable fan, her brother Mychal has played tight end for the team between 2013 and 2016. Rapper Ice Cube is one of their best known fans, having been a vocal supporter since the 1980s, he has written songs about the team and has appeared in many videos promoting the team.

The Autumn Wind, developed in 1974 has become the fight song of the Raider Nation and can be heard aloud at every game.

Notable Fans 
Ice Cube
Eazy E
Ice T
50 Cent
MC Hammer
Bray Wyatt
Sen Dog
James Hetfield
Dave Mustaine
Axl Rose
Robb Flynn
Lars Frederiksen
Billie Joe Armstrong
Neal Schon
Carlos Santana
Joe Satriani
Jeff Hanneman
Mick Thomson
Kerry King
Zoltan Bathory
Fieldy
Shavo Odadjian
Fred Durst
Tommy Shaw
Carson Daly
Tom Hanks
Tiger Woods
Guy Fieri
George Lopez
Naya Rivera
Hunter S. Thompson
Ronda Rousey
Steve Aoki
Blackie Lawless 
James Garner

See also
Bills Mafia
Steeler Nation
Red Sox Nation
Yankees Universe

References

External links

Ice Cube Revisits L.A. Raiders Glory Days
Origins of the Original Raider Nation Website as created by Jim Hudson
Raider Nation: Behind the Makeup

Las Vegas Raiders
Spectators of American football
Culture of Las Vegas
Culture of Los Angeles
Culture of Oakland, California